José Mário Sperry (born 28 September 1966) is a Brazilian heavyweight mixed martial artist. His specialty is Brazilian jiu-jitsu, grappling and ground fighting. He is also one of the founders of the Brazilian Top Team, where he trained fighters such as Antônio Rodrigo Nogueira, Antônio Rogério Nogueira, Ricardo Arona, and Paulo Filho, among others. In January, 2022, Sperry was announced as a member of the inaugural class of the ADCC Hall of Fame in recognition of his accomplishments in submission wrestling.

Career 

Born into a wealthy family, he attended military college where he practised sports like waterpolo, volleyball, and soccer, Sperry started his martial arts career learning Kodokan Judo under master Georges Mehdi. At Brown Belt level, he expanded his training to Brazilian Jiu-Jitsu with Carlson Gracie, becoming one of his main apprentices. Mario earned his black belt in this art at the 1995 World BJJ Championships, where he entered to win the heavyweight Black Belt division, and it was popularly said that until that point he had not lost a single point in his earlier competition career. He gained the nickname "Zé Maquina" ("José Machine") for his relentless performance, which later changed to "Zen Machine" in his introduction to United States.

Having had his mixed martial arts debut in 1995, Sperry debuted in United States as part of the Extreme Fighting event, where he was billed as having a 272-0 fight record. The first round of the tournament saw him face Ecuatorian fighter and Ultimate Fighting Championship runner-up Rudyard Moncayo, whom Sperry defeated by ground and pound, but the second one would see a different outcome against Russian kickboxing and Sambo specialist Igor Zinoviev. 

Although Sperry was able to take him down and assume dominant position in several occasions, Zinoviev kept escaping to his feet every time. After ten minutes, Sperry tried to leap into a rear naked choke while Zinoviev was giving his back and holding the fence, but he slipped and fell in front of the Russian, receiving a kick to the face. Sperry took Zinoviev down anyway, but the kick had opened a deep cut, so the match was stopped to give the win to Igor. At the world BJJ championships in 1998, after winning the title for three consecutive years, Sperry became the first fighter in history to make a Gracie submit in a match when he defeated Royler Gracie in Brazil by koshi-jime or "clock choke".

PRIDE
In 2001, Sperry debuted in Pride Fighting Championships, where the Brazilian Top Team was competing. His first match would be an important victory against Igor Vovchanchyn, who was taken down and submitted by arm triangle choke by the Brazilian fighter. He then went to fought Murilo Rua from Chute Boxe, a team that would get in a rivalry with BTT after this match. Beginning the fight, Rua landed multiple hits in Sperry both standing and on the ground, but the Jiu-Jitsu champion countered with a triangle armbar attempt and tried to get position; however, Rua escaped and landed more strikes, including a soccer kick to the face. At the second round, Sperry came near of the finish with a rolling kneebar and a Kimura lock, but Murilo was able to avoid them and threw several knees to the head. Finally, Rua punished Sperry for most of the third round for a unanimous decision.
 
Mario rebounded back from his loss by defeating Russian Top Team's counterpart Andrei Kopylov, a former world sambo champion. As Kopylov played defensive on the mat, Sperry threw kicks and strikes, cutting him in the mouth for a doctor stoppage while Kopylov was trying a kneebar. Later, in PRIDE Shockwave 2003, Mario faced Pancrase's rising star Yuki Kondo in a back and forth match. They exchanged leglocks on the mat, and later Sperry scored a spectacular takedown, but damage to his eye caused by earlier punches forced the referee to stop the bout.

In 2004, Sperry returned to PRIDE as part of the PRIDE Bushido series, where he knocked out Mike Bencic with a single punch. The next year, he fought Judoka Hirotaka Yokoi in a one-sided affair, with Sperry punishing a turtled up Yokoi with knees and soccer kicks for the win. Mario's last fight in the promotion would be against Yokoi's trainer, the renowned Tsuyoshi "TK" Kohsaka, in 2006. The bout was short, with the two fighters trading punches before Kohsaka landed a right hand for the KO.

Personal life 
Mario has a daughter who was born in March 2005. Sperry is also an avid competitive surfer. Aside from his fighting career, he has a degree in economics.

Championships and accomplishments

Grappling 
 ADCC World Submission Wrestling Championships
 2013: Superfight championship: defeated Fabio Gurgel
 2011: Superfight championship: defeated Renzo Gracie
 2000: Superfight championship: defeated Roberto Traven
 1999: Superfight championship: defeated Enson Inoue
 1998: 88–98 kg: 1st place, Absolute: 1st place
 CBJJ World Championships
 1999: Black Belt Absolute: =3rd place, Black Belt Super Pesado = 2nd place
 1998: Black Belt Absolute: =1st place
 1997: Black Belt Super-Pesado: 1st place, Black Belt Absolute: =3rd place
 1996: Black Belt Pesadissimo: 1st place
 Voted Best Brown Belt in Brazil in 1992.
 Voted Best Purple Belt in Brazil in 1990.
 IBJJF World Championships
 2017: Black Best Master 5 Super Heavy Weight: 1st place
 2017: Black Belt Master 5 Absolute: 2nd place
 Other
 Black Belt World Mundial Champion 1996, 1997, and 1998.
 Brazilian National Black Belt Heavyweight Champion 1994 and 1995.

Mixed Martial Arts 
 Coliseum 2000
 Coliseum 2000 Heavyweight Championship (One time)
 Extreme Fighting
 Extreme Fighting Middleweight Tournament Runner Up
 Martial Arts Reality Super Fight
 Martial Arts Reality Super Fight Championship (One time)
 Ultimate Caged Combat
 1997 Ultimate Caged Combat Overall Championship Tournament Winner
 Other
 Vale Tudo Super Fight Champion at the Titanic Duel in Brazil 1995

Mixed martial arts record 

|-
| Win
| align=center| 13-4
| Lee Hasdell
| Submission (rear naked choke)
| Cage Rage 22
| 
| align=center| 1
| align=center| 1:39
| London, England
| 
|-
| Loss
| align=center| 12-4
| Tsuyoshi Kohsaka
| TKO (punches)
| PRIDE 31: Dreamers
| 
| align=center| 1
| align=center| 1:20
| Saitama, Japan
| 
|-
| Win
| align=center| 12-3
| Hirotaka Yokoi
| TKO (knees)
| PRIDE 29
| 
| align=center| 1
| align=center| 9:08
| Saitama, Japan
| 
|-
| Win
| align=center| 11-3
| Mike Bencic
| KO (punch)
| PRIDE Bushido 2
| 
| align=center| 1
| align=center| 0:11
| Yokohama, Japan
| 
|-
| Loss
| align=center| 10-3
| Yuki Kondo
| TKO (doctor stoppage)
| PRIDE Shockwave 2003
| 
| align=center| 1
| align=center| 3:27
| Saitama, Japan
| 
|-
| Win
| align=center| 10-2
| Andrei Kopylov
| TKO (cut)
| PRIDE 22
| 
| align=center| 1
| align=center| 6:02
| Japan
| 
|-
| Win
| align=center| 9-2
| Wataru Sakata
| Decision (unanimous)
| UFO: Legend
| 
| align=center| 3
| align=center| 5:00
| Tokyo, Japan
| 
|-
| Loss
| align=center| 8-2
| Murilo Rua
| Decision (unanimous)
| PRIDE 20
| 
| align=center| 3
| align=center| 5:00
| Yokohama, Japan
| 
|-
| Win
| align=center| 8-1
| Igor Vovchanchyn
| Submission (arm-triangle choke)
| PRIDE 17
| 
| align=center| 1
| align=center| 2:52
| Tokyo, Japan
| 
|-
| Win
| align=center| 7-1
| Hiromitsu Kanehara
| Decision (majority)
| C2K Colosseum 2000
| 
| align=center| 3
| align=center| 5:00
| Japan
| Won Coliseum 2000 Heavyweight Championship
|-
| Win
| align=center| 6-1
| Chris Haseman
| TKO (submission to punches)
| Caged Combat 1: Australian Ultimate Fighting
| 
| align=center| 1
| align=center| 1:12
| Sydney, Australia
| Won Caged Combat 1 Tournament
|-
| Win
| align=center| 5-1
| Neil Bodycote
| TKO (submission to punches)
| Caged Combat 1: Australian Ultimate Fighting
| 
| align=center| 1
| align=center| 0:47
| Sydney, Australia
| Caged Combat 1 Semifinals
|-
| Win
| align=center| 4-1
| Vernon White
| Decision (unanimous)
| Caged Combat 1: Australian Ultimate Fighting
| 
| align=center| 3
| align=center| 5:00
| Sydney, Australia
| Caged Combat 1 First Round
|-
| Win
| align=center| 3-1
| Andrey Dudko
| Submission(kimura)
| MARS: Martial Arts Reality Superfighting
| 
| align=center| 1
| align=center| 4:15
| Alabama, United States
| Won MARS Superfight Championship
|-
| Loss
| align=center| 2-1
| Igor Zinoviev
| TKO (doctor stoppage)
| Extreme Fighting 1
| 
| align=center| 1
| align=center| 11:39
| North Carolina, United States
| EDC Middleweight Tournament finals
|-
| Win
| align=center| 2-0
| Rudyard Moncayo
| TKO (submission to punches)
| Extreme Fighting 1
| 
| align=center| 1
| align=center| 2:42
| North Carolina, United States
| EFC Middleweight Tournament Semifinal
|-
| Win
| align=center| 1-0
| Jose Balduino
| TKO (submission to strikes)
| Duelo de Titas 1
| 
| align=center| N/A
| align=center| N/A
| Brazil
|

Submission grappling record
KO PUNCHES
|- style="text-align:center; background:#f0f0f0;"
| style="border-style:none none solid solid; "|Result
| style="border-style:none none solid solid; "|Opponent
| style="border-style:none none solid solid; "|Method
| style="border-style:none none solid solid; "|Event
| style="border-style:none none solid solid; "|Date
| style="border-style:none none solid solid; "|Round
| style="border-style:none none solid solid; "|Time
| style="border-style:none none solid solid; "|Notes
|-
|Loss|| Ricardo Liborio || Decision || ADCC 2015 Superfight || 2015|| || ||
|-
|Win|| Fabio Gurgel || Decision || ADCC 2013 Absolute || 2013|| || ||
|-
|Win|| Renzo Gracie || Points || ADCC 2011 Absolute || 2011|| || ||
|-
|Loss|| Roger Gracie || Points || ADCC 2003 –99 kg || 2003|| || ||
|-
|Loss|| Mark Kerr || Penalty || ADCC 1999 Absolute || 2001|| || ||
|-
|Win|| Enson Inoue || Points || ADCC 1999 Absolute || 1999|| || ||
|-
|Loss|| Rodrigo Comprido || Advantage || World Championship|| 1999|| || ||
|-
|Loss|| Leonardo Leite || Points || World Championship|| 1999|| || ||
|-
|Win|| Roberto Roleta || Advantage || World Championship|| 1998|| || ||
|-
|Win|| Royler Gracie || Submission (clock choke) || World Championship|| 1998|| || ||
|-
|Loss|| Roberto Roleta || Points || World Championship|| 1998|| || ||
|-
|Win|| Simon Siasi || Sumission (kneebar) || ADCC 1998 Absolute|| 1998|| || ||
|-
|Win|| Oleg Taktarov || Points || ADCC 1998 Absolute|| 1998|| || ||
|-
|Win|| Ricardo Alves || Submission (choke) || ADCC 1998 –99 kg|| 1998|| || ||
|-
|Win|| Renato Verissimo || Submission (choke) || ADCC 1998 –99 kg|| 1998|| || ||
|-
|Win|| Larry Parker || Submission (armbar) || ADCC 1998 –99 kg|| 1998|| || ||
|-
|Win|| Muhammad Saleh || Points || ADCC 1998 –99 kg|| 1998|| || ||
|-
|Win|| Roberto Correa || Submission (wrist lock) || World Championship|| 1997|| || ||
|-
|Win|| Saulo Ribeiro || Points || World Championship|| 1997|| || ||
|-
|Win|| Francisco Bueno || Submission (wrist lock) || Atlantico Sul|| 1994|| || ||
|-

Notable students  
 Carlão Santos
 Marcello Salazar

References

External links 
 
 

1966 births
Brazilian male mixed martial artists
Brazilian people of English descent
Brazilian practitioners of Brazilian jiu-jitsu
Brazilian male judoka
Heavyweight mixed martial artists
Mixed martial artists utilizing judo
Mixed martial artists utilizing Brazilian jiu-jitsu
Living people
People awarded a black belt in Brazilian jiu-jitsu
Sportspeople from Porto Alegre
World Brazilian Jiu-Jitsu Championship medalists
ADCC Hall of Fame inductees